Ñāṇasaṃvara is a Shan Buddhist monk of the Thai Forest Tradition, specifically the Northern Thai Forest Tradition established by Khruba Siwichai. He is known as Phra Khuva Boonchum or Khruba Bonchum (ครูบาบุญชุ่ม) by Thai followers, and as the Mong Pong Sayadaw by his Burmese followers. His serious solitary meditation practices, and his known for his solitary meditation retreats in caves in Thailand, Myanmar, and Bhutan. His followers include prominent Burmese officials, such as Khin Nyunt. He serves as the abbot of Wat Phra That Don Ruang (วัดพระธาตุดอนเรือง) in Tachileik, Shan State, Myanmar.

He amassed additional prominence in Thailand and Myanmar during the Tham Luang cave rescue by accurately predicting when the trapped boys would be discovered and that they would be found alive.

Early life 
Ñāṇasaṃvara was born on 5 January 1965 in Mae Kham, Chiang Rai Province, Thailand as the eldest son of a Shan-speaking family originally from Mong Yong, near Kengtung, Shan State, Burma. His grandparents migrated to Chiang Saen, Thailand. After receiving samanera ordination as a child, he received upasampada ordination at the age of 21 on 9 May 1986.

References 

Thai Theravada Buddhist monks
1965 births
People from Chiang Rai province
Living people
Thai Forest Tradition monks